The Turkey men's national under-18 ice hockey team is the men's national under-18 ice hockey team of Turkey. The team is controlled by the Turkish Ice Hockey Federation, a member of the International Ice Hockey Federation. The team represents Turkey at the IIHF World U18 Championships.

Best Win/Lose
 52-1  1997

 24-0   2008

Results Summary
As of 1 Jan 2023.

OTW and OTL Suppose Draw.

International competitions

World U-17 Hockey Challenge

IIHF European Junior Championships

Results

IIHF World U18 Championships

Results
OTW and OTL (Since 2007) Suppose Draw.

Roster

Notable players
 Berk Akın (GK), Best Goalkeeper - 2013 IIHF World U18 Championships-Division III Group B
 Fatih Faner (D), Best Player selected by team coach - 2013 IIHF World U18 Championships-Division III Group B

External links
Turkey at IIHF.com
European Ice Hockey Online-Players

National under-18 ice hockey teams
Youth boy's
Youth ice hockey in Turkey